General elections were held in the Dominican Republic on 16 May 1970. The main opposition party, the Dominican Revolutionary Party, did not contest the election, leaving only the ruling Reformist Party and some right-wing and centre-right parties. Incumbent Joaquín Balaguer won the presidential election, whilst his Reformist Party won the Congressional elections. Voter turnout was 63.5%.

Results

President

Congress

References

Dominican Republic general election
General election
Elections in the Dominican Republic
1970
Dominican Republic general election